Berat Ayberk Özdemir (born 23 May 1998) is a Turkish professional footballer who plays as a defensive midfielder for Saudi Pro League club Al-Ettifaq.

Professional career
Özdemir made his professional debut for Gençlerbirliği in a 1-0 Süper Lig loss to Çaykur Rizespor on 17 August 2019. On 5 January 2021, he signed a 4.5-year contract with Trabzonspor.

On 9 August 2022, Özdemir joined Saudi Arabian club Al-Ettifaq on a three-year deal.

International career
Özdemir debuted for the Turkey national team in a 1–1 2022 FIFA World Cup qualification tie with Norway on 8 October 2021.

Honours
Trabzonspor
Turkish Super Cup: 2020, 2022
Süper Lig: 2021–22

References

External links
 
 
 

1998 births
Living people
People from Melikgazi
Turkish footballers
Turkey international footballers
Turkey under-21 international footballers
Turkey youth international footballers
Gençlerbirliği S.K. footballers
Hacettepe S.K. footballers
Trabzonspor footballers
Ettifaq FC players
Süper Lig players
TFF First League players
Saudi Professional League players
Association football midfielders
Turkish expatriate footballers
Expatriate footballers in Saudi Arabia
Turkish expatriate sportspeople in Saudi Arabia